The Oeiras Ladies Open is a tournament for professional female tennis players played on outdoor clay courts. The event is classified as a $80,000 ITF Women's World Tennis Tour tournament and has been held in Oeiras, Portugal, since 2021.

Past finals

Singles

Doubles

External links 
 ITF search

ITF Women's World Tennis Tour
Clay court tennis tournaments
Tennis tournaments in Portugal
2021 establishments in Portugal